Photographica (minor planet designation: 443 Photographica) is a typical Main belt asteroid. It is classified as an S-type asteroid.

It was discovered by Max Wolf and A. Schwassmann on 17 February 1899 in Heidelberg.

References

External links
 
 

Background asteroids
Photographica
Photographica
Photographica
S-type asteroids (Tholen)
Sl-type asteroids (SMASS)
18990217